Benedictine may mean:
A Benedictine, a monk or nun who belongs to the Order of Saint Benedict
Benedictine abbey
Benedictine College in Atchison, Kansas
Benedictine High School (disambiguation)
Benedictine University in Lisle, Illinois
Bénédictine, a liqueur
Benedictine (spread), a spread/dip made with cucumbers and cream cheese